The Protected areas of Tamil Nadu State in South India cover an area of , constituting 2.54% of the geographic area and 15% of the  recorded forest area. It ranks 14th among all the States and Union Territories of India in terms of total protected area.

Creation and administration of Protected areas in South India originated with the Maharajas of the Southern Princely States' private hunting grounds. The Mudumalai National Park, established in 1940, was the first modern Wildlife Sanctuary in South India. Most protected areas throughout its 30 Districts are under the stewardship of the Ministry of Environment and Forests (India) and the Tamil Nadu Forest Department.

Biosphere reserves 
The three Biosphere Reserves in Tamil Nadu are:
Gulf of Mannar Biosphere Reserve: ; established in 1989.
Nilgiri Biosphere Reserve: , of which 2537.6 km² is in Tamil Nadu. Established in 1986.
Agasthyamalai Biosphere Reserve: ; established in 2001.

National parks 
<div>
Tamil Nadu has five National Parks covering .
 Anamalai Tiger Reserve (formerly Aanamalai National Park, Indira Gandhi National Park): ; established 1989.
 Mudumalai National Park: ; established 1990.
 Mukurthi National Park: ; established 1982.
 Gulf of Mannar Marine National Park: ; established 1980.
 Guindy National Park: ; established 1976.
 Palani Hills Wildlife Sanctuary and National Park (proposed)

Wildlife sanctuaries 

Tamil Nadu has the following wildlife sanctuaries:
 Grizzled Squirrel Wildlife Sanctuary: ; giant squirrel sanctuary near Srivilliputhur
 Anamalai Tiger Reserve
 Kalakkad Mundanthurai Tiger Reserve: 
 Kanyakumari Wildlife Sanctuary: 
 Mudumalai Wildlife Sanctuary: ; overlaps with Mudumalai National Park
 Sathyamangalam Wildlife Sanctuary: 
 Vallanadu Wildlife Sanctuary: 
 Point Calimere Wildlife and Bird Sanctuary
 Megamalai Wildlife Sanctuary
 Point Calimere Wildlife Sanctuary
 Kodaikanal Wildlife Sanctuary
 Gangaikondan Spotted Deer Sanctuary
 Cauvery North Wildlife sanctuary
 Nellai Wildlife Sanctuary
 Kaduvur Slender Loris Sanctuary
 Cauvery South Wildlife Sanctuary

Elephant reserves 

Tamil Nadu participates in Project Elephant, and has five elephant sanctuaries.
 Nilgiri Elephant Reserve: , protected area ; established 2003.
 Coimbatore Elephant Reserve: , protected area ; established 2003.
 Anamalai Elephant Reserve , protected area ; established 2003.
 Srivilliputtur Elephant Reserve, protected area ; established 2002.
 Agasthiyamalai Elephant Reserve, protected area ; established 2022.

Tiger reserves 

Though The 2008 census indicated a decline in tiger population all over India, the only exception was in Tamil Nadu where the animals' numbers have increased to 76 from 60 five years ago. Tamil Nadu participates in Project Tiger and has four tiger reserves:
 Kalakkad Mundanthurai Tiger Reserve: ; part of Agasthyamala Biosphere Reserve.
  Mudumalai National Park was declared a tiger reserve in April 2007. Subsequently, about 350 families living in the core area have been evicted from the park and given 1 million rupee ($20,800) compensation. Those in the 5 km buffer area around the park will be involved in the project as trackers and guides to enhance their income through eco-tourism.
 Anamalai Tiger Reserve: declared a Tiger Reserve in 2008.
 Sathyamangalam Wildlife Sanctuary was declared a tiger reserve in 2011.
Srivilliputhur Megamalai Tiger Reserve is the fifth tiger reserve in Tamil Naduand 51st Tiger Reserve of India. An area of 1,01,657.13 hectares or 1016.5713 sq.km in Srivilliputhur Grizzled Giant Squirrel Sanctuary and Megamalai Wildlife Sanctuary have been combined to create the tiger reserve. With this new tiger reserve, Vaigai river and its catchment areas will be fully protected.

Bird sanctuaries 

 Chitrangudi Bird Sanctuary: 
 Kanjirankulam Bird Sanctuary: 
 Karaivetti Bird Sanctuary: 
 Karikili Bird Sanctuary
 Koothankulam Bird Sanctuary: 
 Melaselvanur – Kilaselvanur Bird Sanctuary: .
 Point Calimere Wildlife and Bird Sanctuary: 
 Pulicat Lake Bird Sanctuary: 
 Udayamarthandapuram Bird Sanctuary: 
 Vaduvoor Bird Sanctuary: 
 Vedanthangal Bird Sanctuary: 
 Vellode Birds Sanctuary: 
 Vettangudi Bird Sanctuary: 
 Viralimalai Peacock Sanctuary
 Kallaperambur Lake near Thanjavur
 Suchindram Theroor Birds Sanctuary

Conservation reserves and community reserves 
Tiruvidaimarudur Conservation Reserve

Zoos 

Six zoos in Tamil Nadu are recognised by the Central Zoo Authority of India. The state has Four State owned and Two Private zoos.
 Arignar Anna Zoological Park: 
 Guindy Children's Park: (22 Acre)
 Amirthi Zoological Park, Vellore
 Kurumbapatti Zoological Park, Salem
 Chennai Snake Park
 Madras Crocodile Bank Trust

Crocodile farms 

Tamil Nadu five crocodile farms:
 Amaravati Sagar Crocodile Farm, Coimbatore district
 Hogenakkal Crocodile Bank, Dharmapuri district
 Kurumbapatti Crocodile farm, Salem district
 Madras Crocodile Bank Trust, Chennai
 Sathanur Dam Crocodile Bank, Tiruvannamalai district

Regional cooperation 
Senior forestry officials cooperate on mutual issues concerning conservation and protection of forests and wildlife of the region. A regular conference of the forest ministers and forest officials of the southern states is held once a year, in rotation in each State. The Forest Ministers of Kerala, Tamil Nadu, Andhra Pradesh and Karnataka, senior officials of the Ministry of Environment and Forests, Government of India, Forest Secretaries of Tamil Nadu and Kerala, Special Secretary for Forests, Andhra Pradesh, Principal Chief Conservator of Forests of Kerala, Tamil Nadu, Andhra Pradesh and Karnataka, together with the senior forest officials of these states and the Union Territory of Pondicherry, met at Thiruvananthapuram on 3 and 4 November 2006 and resolved several mutual issues concerning conservation and protection of forests and wildlife of the region. This formalization of interstate cooperation on protected areas administration improves effectiveness in the areas of: daily staff communication including common wireless frequencies, joint enforcement action, boundary survey and demarcation, management of cross border resources like Biosphere Reserves, National Parks, Tiger reserves and Wildlife Sanctuaries, technology, staff and intelligence sharing and coordinated communication with the Government of India, especially allotting more funds for conservation and forestation activities of State Forest Departments by the Union Government. The second meeting was held at Bangalore on 21 and 22 September 2007.
The third meeting was held at Hyderabad on 25 and 26 October 2008.

References

External links 
About Tamil Nadu Department of Forests
page 13, United Nations List of National Parks and Protected Areas: India (2002)
Protected Areas consolidated data of whole India released by government updated upto May 2019.
Ministry of Environment and Forests, 2006 Report

 
Lists of protected areas of India
Lists of tourist attractions in Tamil Nadu